Erin E. Stead (born December 27, 1982) is an American illustrator of children's books. She won the 2011 Caldecott Medal for the year's best-illustrated U.S. picture book, recognizing her first publication, A Sick Day for Amos McGee.

Biography

Stead was born in Farmington Hills, Michigan, and met her husband, Philip Christian Stead in art class at Divine Child High School in Dearborn, Michigan. They married in September 2005 and moved to New York City, where he worked at the Brooklyn Children's Museum. She worked at Books of Wonder bookstore and as an assistant to the creative director at HarperCollins Children's Books. After moving back to Ann Arbor they collaborated on A Sick Day for Amos McGee, about the day a zookeeper stays home because he is sick. It was his second book and her first. Philip wrote characters he felt would be perfect for Erin to illustrate. She used wood blocks for color work and pencil lines for detailing. Amos McGee was edited by Neal Porter at Roaring Brooks Press and named one of the "10 Best Illustrated Children's Books" for 2010 by The New York Times.

Stead's second book, And Then It's Spring, written by Julie Fogliano (Neal Porter, 2012), was a runner-up for the 2012 Boston Globe–Horn Book Award.. Lenny & Lucy arrived in 2015.

The Steads currently live in Ann Arbor, Michigan, where he teaches at Washtenaw Community College.

Works

Erin E. Stead has illustrated books by other writers. Most of her works are picture books published by Roaring Brook Press of New York City under the imprint Neal Porter Books. Porter had previously handled Philip Stead's debut book.
 A Sick Day for Amos McGee, by Philip C. Stead (Roaring Brook, 2010)
 And Then It's Spring, Julie Fogliano (2012)
 Bear Has a Story to Tell, Philip Stead (2012)
 If You Want to See a Whale, Julie Fogliano (2013)
 Lenny & Lucy, by Philip C. Stead (2015)
 The Purloining of Prince Oleomargarine, by Mark Twain and Philip Stead (Doubleday Books for Young Readers, 2017)
 Music for Mr. Moon by Philip Stead (Holiday House, 2019)
 Amos McGee Misses the Bus (2021)

Notes

References

External links

 
 'Hello? It's the ALA Calling': Stead and Vanderpool on Winning the Big Prize
 – By Diane Roback, Publishers Weekly, January 13, 2011
 
 Philip Christian Stead at LC Authorities, with 9 records

1982 births
American children's book illustrators
Caldecott Medal winners
People from Farmington Hills, Michigan
Writers from Michigan
Living people